The Papar District is an administrative district in the Malaysian state of Sabah, part of the West Coast Division which includes the districts of Kota Belud, Kota Kinabalu, Papar, Penampang, Putatan, Ranau and Tuaran. The capital of the district is in Papar Town.

Etymology 
The name 'Papar' comes from a Bruneian word meaning 'flat or open land'.

History 
As with most of the west coast of Sabah, it was originally ruled by the Bruneian sultanate. Its first local leader was Datu Amir Bahar, of Bajau descent. It was then handed to Overbeck and Dent brothers in 1877 by the Sultanate of Brunei. The first British officer to serve in Papar was H.L. Leicester, who took office in February 1878 aiming to increase Papar's revenues. He was replaced by Alfred Hart Everett after failing to improve Papar's economic outlook.

Demographics 

According to the last census in 2010, the population of Papar district is estimated to be around 124,420 inhabitants, comprising Bruneian Malay (especially in Benoni, Buang Sayang, Bongawan, Kampung Laut, Kelanahan, Kimanis, Kinarut), Kadazan-Dusun (especially in Rampazan, Limbahau, Kinarut, Kopimpinan, Lakut, Mondolipau, Koiduan, Ulu Kimanis, Sumbiling, Limputung) and Bajau (mainly in Pengalat Besar, Pengalat Kecil, Kawang, Beringgis). A significant number of Chinese comprising Hakka and Hokkien peoples also exists in the district. As in other districts of Sabah, there are a significant number of illegal immigrants from the nearby southern Philippines, mainly from the Sulu Archipelago and Mindanao, many of whom are not included in the population statistics.

Education 
Papar is known as the West Coast Division education hub. Institut Kemahiran Belia Negara (National Youth Skill Institute) or IKBN and Maktab Rendah Sains MARA (MARA Science College) or MRSM are the first IKBN and MRSM built in Sabah. There are also Jabatan Pembangunan Sumber Manusia or "JPSM" which has been developed in late 1990s. Papar main secondary schools are SMK Pengalat, SMK Majakir, SMK Benoni, SMK Takis, SMK Kinarut, SMK Bongawan I/II, SM St. Joseph, SM Cheng Hwa, SMK St. Mary and Papar Middle School. Papar has the most religious schools among districts; SMK(A) Tun Datu Mustapha, SMK(A) Limauan, new SMA Toh Puan Hajah Rahmah and SMA Islamiah Papar. Both SMK are under central government administrative while both SMA are under state government administrative. Papar education complex type area is situated at Kinarut which includes the IKBN, MRSM, SMK(A) Tun Datu Mustapha and SMA Toh Puan Hajah Rahmah. A number of primary schools also can be found in the district such as SK Sacred Heart Biau, SK Padawan, SK Limputong, SK St. Joseph, SK Benoni, SK Surati (which is also the location of the District Education Office), SK Pengalat, SK Kinarut, SK St. Mary Limbahau, SK Takis, SJKC Cheng Hwa and much more.

Tourism 

Tourism is an important industry in Papar, arguably coming after the agriculture industry. Many resorts can be found along the coast. Some of the tourist attractions in the district are:
 Beringgis Beach Resort
 Borneo Paradise Beach Hotel
 Melinsung Bay Beach Resort
 Langkah Syabas Beach Resort
 Dinawan Island
 Kawang Forest Centre
 KK Adventure Park
 Mai Aman
 Utan Paradise Jungle Camp
 Kampung Serbang Bongawan
 Kinolosodon River
 Pantai Manis

Gallery

See also 
 Districts of Malaysia

References

Further reading

External links 

  Papar District Council
  Papar District Office